Baptist Memorial Hospital-Golden Triangle is a hospital in Columbus, Mississippi, and part of the Baptist Memorial Health Care network.

Overview
Baptist Memorial has 328 beds and is a Level III trauma facility. The hospital is the seventh largest provider of medical and surgical services in the state of Mississippi.

The hospital has been certified by The Joint Commission. In 2009, it employed a total of 1,100 people, including 100 doctors, making it Lowndes County's largest private employer.
Baptist Golden Triangle is also home to one of the best ambulance services in the state of Mississippi which has received several awards including the Lifeline award for excellence in prehospital cardiac care.

References

External links

Hospitals in Mississippi
Buildings and structures in Lowndes County, Mississippi
Trauma centers